Acolatse is a surname. Notable people with the surname include:

Charles Acolatse (born 1995), French-born Togolese footballer
Elton Acolatse (born 1995), Dutch footballer 
Guy Acolatse (born 1942), Togolese footballer 
Sena Acolatse (born 1990), American-Canadian ice hockey player